Topas is a municipality located in the province of Salamanca, Castile and León, Spain

Topas may also refer to:
Tópas, a confection produced by the Icelandic company, Nói Síríus
Topas (magician), German magician and comedian
OT-62 TOPAS, a Polish/Czechoslovakian series of amphibious tracked armoured personnel carriers
An apprentice in a lascar ship's crew
A software package used in the analysis of powder diffraction data
Topass, a Portuguese ethnicity in the Indian Ocean

See also
Topa, a census town in Hazaribag district in the Indian state of Jharkhand
Topa River, a tributary of the Holod River in Romania
Sir Thopas, a fictional character in The Canterbury Tales by Geoffrey Chaucer